Gustavo Cárdenas Ávila, also known as Jan (born April 30, 1974 in Celaya, Guanajuato, Mexico) is a Mexican pop singer and actor, who had success as a pop-ballad singer in the 1990s and later became a screen and stage actor.

Early life
His parents are Gustavo Cardenas and Aurora Avila. He has an older sister named Aurora.

Career
He started his career in 1997 when he was discovered by Raul Velasco and was given the opportunity to sing in the dominical show Siempre en Domingo.

Jan recorded his first album in 1997, simply named also "Jan", it contained the pop-ballad Chiara, which became a strong hit in the same year on the charts in Ibero-America, although the theme did not have a promotional video; the single was presented on Siempre en Domingo for the world. The song talks about a loved one who died due to terminal disease.

Soon he was given the opportunity to act in the soap opera Soñadoras. He also participated in Dkda, Mi destino eres tu, La intrusa, navidad sin fin, Niña Amada Mía, Amarte es mi Pecado, Rubí, Apuesta por un amor, Alborada, Peregrina, and Heridas de Amor. Recently (2007) Destilando Amor as Patricio with Eduardo Yáñez, Angélica Rivera and Sergio Sendel. Also he has participated as host for Univision in several occasions, Desfile de las Rosas 2001, Primer Festival del Mariachi, Premios Juventud 2006, and several appearances in Premio Lo Nuestro. And with Televisa he hosted Celebremos Mexico: hecho en mexico.

Television
 Corazón Indomable (2013)
 Como dice el dicho (2012).... Ponce
 Rafaela (2011).... Rene Echeverria
 Destilando amor (2007).... Patricio Iturbe
 Heridas de Amor (2006).... Luciano Sartori
 Alborada (2005).... Santiago de Corsa
 Peregrina (2005).... Él mismo
 Apuesta por un amor (2004).... Dr. Felipe Calzada
 Rubí (2004).... Marco
 Amarte es mi pecado (2004).... Roberto Peña
 Niña amada mía (2003).... Mauricio Barocio
 Amigas y rivales (2001).... Julio
 Navidad sin fin (2001) (mini).... Rodito
 La intrusa (2001).... Johnny
 Mi destino eres tú (2000).... Fernando Rivadeniera del Encino
 DKDA: Sueños de juventud (1999-2000).... Rodrigo Arias
 Soñadoras (1998-1999).... Gerardo Rinalde

References

External links
Official Website

1974 births
Living people
Male actors from Guanajuato
Singers from Guanajuato
People from Celaya
20th-century Mexican male actors
21st-century Mexican male actors
21st-century Mexican singers
21st-century Mexican male singers